Caroline Chapman (c. 1818, London – 8 May 1876, San Francisco) was an early-American actress (early-to-mid-19th century), who spent a large part of her adult life acting in the theatres of San Francisco.

References 

 American National Biography, 24 volumes, edited by John A. Garraty and Mark C. Carnes, Oxford University Press, New York (1999)
 Biography Index. A cumulative index to biographical material in books and magazines, Volume 17: September, 1990-August, 1992, H.W. Wilson Co, New York (1992)
 James D. Hart, A Companion to California, Oxford University Press, New York (1978)
 Dictionary of Women Worldwide. 25,000 women through the ages, three volumes, edited by Anne Commire, Yorkin Publications, Waterford, Connecticut (2007)
 Norma Olin Ireland, Index to Women of the World from Ancient to Modern Times: A Supplement, Scarecrow Press, Metuchen, New Jersey (1988)
 Helen Throop Pratt, Souvenirs of an Interesting Family, California Historical Society Quarterly, Vol. 7, No. 3, pps. 282–285 (Sep. 1928)
 Famous Early Families: The Starks; the Bakers; the Chapmans, Vol. 3, edited by Lawrence Estavan, San Francisco Theatre Research, WPA (1938)
 The Cambridge Guide to American Theatre, 2nd edition, edited by Don B. Wilmeth, Cambridge University Press (October 22, 2007)

Inline citations

1810s births
1876 deaths
English emigrants to the United States
19th-century American actresses
American stage actresses